Tilaknagar is a suburb in Hyderabad, Telangana, India. It lies adjacent  to the Government-run Fever Hospital and railway track . As it an residentital and growing commercial area .      It also  has many schools, medical shops and grocery shops and also there is a super market of reliance mart . 
The City Central Library is located  few km from here.

The are also few Temples located here .

Several popular cinemas are few  distance from here screen predominantly Telugu (Tollywood) movies.

Tilaknagar is well connected by TSRTC bus and the frequency of buses  is  every 5 minutes .
The closest MMTS Train station is at Vidyanagar.
The closest public airport is Rajiv Gandhi International Airport 
Nearest  Hyderabad Metro is at Chikkadpally metro station .

Hospitals
 
 Woodlands Hospital  
 Tilak Nagar Hospital

Banks

 Union Bank of India formerly known as Andhra Bank
 Allahabad Bank

Schools
 Care model high school
 Medha high school
 St.Hannah's High School
 Indian Academy high School

Boarding and Lodging
  OYO Townhouse White Ridge 112

References

Neighbourhoods in Hyderabad, India